Moscow-Cassiopeia is a Soviet comic science fiction film directed by Richard Viktorov based on a script by Isai Kuznetsov and Avenir Zak. Followed by Teens in the Universe (second part, 1975).

Synopsis
From the depths of the universe Earth can hear the radio signals of intelligent beings from a planet of the star system Shedar in the Cassiopeia constellation. A project is set up, proposed by the young inventor Vitya Sereda, to send a spaceship to reach the planet - but the flight will last for decades, so the crew of the spaceship ЗАРЯ or Zarya (an acronym for Spaceship (zvezdolet) Annihilation Relativistical Nuclear (yaderniy), also meaning "dawn"), is to be recruited from teenage students.

The project is all carefully thought out but student Fyodor Lobanov stows away aboard the starship and unwittingly causes it to transcend the speed of light and so reaching its target 27 years ahead of schedule...

Cast 
Innokenty Smoktunovsky as S.S.E. (Special Service Executive)
 Vasili Merkuryev as academician Blagovidov
 Lev Durov as academician Filatov
 Yuri Medvedev as academician Ogon-Duganovsky
 Pyotr Merkuryev as academician Kurochkin

Space ship DAWN crew 
 Mikhail Yershov as Victor Sereda
 Aleksandr Grigoryev as Pavel Kozelkov
 Vladimir Savin as Mikhail Kopanygin
 Vladimir Basov Jr. as Feodor Lobanov
 Olga Bityukova as Varvara Kuteishchikova
 Nadezhda Ovcharova as Yulia Sorokina
 Irina Popova as Katya Panfyorova

Other cast 
 Anatoly Adoskin
 Natalya Fateyeva
 Nikolai Figurovsky
 Artyom Karapetyan
 Valentina Kutsenko
 Sergei Radchenko
 Raisa Ryazanova
 Nadezhda Semyontsova
 Natalya Strizhenova
 Anna Viktorova
 Nikolai Viktorov
 Mikhail Yanushkevich

Filming
Initially, there was a single script, without dividing into two films, but when the amount of footage exceeded the standard timekeeping of a Soviet film, permission was obtained from the Goskino USSR to shoot two: "Moscow — Cassiopeia" and "Teens in the Universe". This did not affect the filming process in any way, as a result of which in the second film in some episodes the guys look younger than in the first. Cosmonaut Georgy Beregovoy was a consultant for the film.

The costumes for the heroes were made of metallized nylon, high boots were equipped with magnetic suction cups, and the astronauts had a sense catcher on their chests that translated from any language of the Universe.

The weightlessness scene was a reference to Stanley Kubrick's 2001: A Space Odyssey and was shot in 4 stages with the participation of Valery Pavlotos, a design engineer at the Yalta Film Studio. The movements of each actor along their own trajectory made a strong impression on the jury of the X "UNIATEC" International competition.

Awards
 Premio for the Best Film for Kids of the All-Union Cinema Festival, Baku, 1974
 Special Premio of the International Cinema Festival of Science Fiction Films, Triest, 1975
 Special Prize of the International Cinema Festival (in the Children films category), Moscow, 1975
 Platero Prize of the International Cinema Festival as the film for the Kids and Youth, Gijón, 1975.
 Diploma of the Moscow Technical Contest of the Films, UNIATEK congress, Moscow, 1976
 State Premio of RSFSR in the honour of Vasilyiev Brothers, 1977.

References

External links

1974 films
1970s science fiction comedy-drama films
Russian science fiction comedy-drama films
1970s Russian-language films
Soviet science fiction comedy-drama films
Space adventure films
Films about time travel
Gorky Film Studio films